Dejan Jovković (born 23 July 1968) is a Serbian former sprinter. He competed in the men's 200 metres at the 1992 Summer Olympics as an Independent Olympic Participant.

References

External links
 

1968 births
Living people
People from Zemun
Athletes from Belgrade
Serbian male sprinters
Yugoslav male sprinters
Athletes (track and field) at the 1992 Summer Olympics
Olympic athletes as Independent Olympic Participants
Mediterranean Games silver medalists for Yugoslavia
Mediterranean Games medalists in athletics
Athletes (track and field) at the 1991 Mediterranean Games